Sumi is a 2022 Indian Marathi language feature film directed by Amol Gole and written by Sanjeev K Jha, produced under Harshal Kamat Entertainment in association with Golden Mouse Productions. In 2022, The film won National Award in two prestigious category, National Film Award for Best Children's Film and National Film Award for Best Child Artist.

Plot

Set in rural India, Sumi is an ‘optimistic & inspiring tale’ of a 12-year-old underprivileged Sumati, who dreams of getting a bicycle to commute to her school, many miles away from her village. To meet her modest need, she embarks on an extraordinary journey marked by struggle, ambition, commitment, and friendship.

Production

Development 
While talking about the film SUMI, writer Sanjeev K Jha mentions in his interviews that "the story is very close to his own childhood experiences. He hails from Champaran, close to Gandhiji’s Ashram - where the concept of Ashram education first took shape. In the year 2002, during his own school days he used to see girls cycling the distance to their schools. But such girls were few. Only 1 or 2 compared to some 20 odd boys, and this was undoubtedly an act of bravery for the girls. This ‘Going to School’ childhood remained with the writer as did the lone girl riding a blue cycle in a group of 20 boys. This became the first visual of the film. After this, consciously and unconsciously, his childhood experiences kept bleeding into the film.

Cast

 Akanksha Pingle as Sumati
 Divyesh Indulkar
 Smita Tambe

Awards

References

External links
 

Best Children's Film National Film Award winners
National Film Awards (India)
2020 films
Indian children's films
Films set in Maharashtra
Films shot in Maharashtra
2020s Hindi-language films
Films about education
Indian drama films
Indian children's drama films
Indian teen drama films
Indian coming-of-age drama films